The Schwarzbach is a river of Saxony, Germany. It rises in Eilenberg and flows northerly from there through the communities of Sprotta, Doberschütz, Battaune, Wöllnau, Pressel, Authausen, Görschlitz and Bad Düben, where it becomes a right tributary of the Mulde.

See also
List of rivers of Saxony

References

Rivers of Saxony
Rivers of Germany